Aleksandr Nikitin may refer to:
 Alexander Nikitin, Russian submarine officer and nuclear safety inspector turned environmentalist
 Aleksandr Nikitin (chess player), Russian chess player
 Aleksandr Nikitin (footballer), Russian football coach and player
 Aleksandr Nikitin (politician), Russian politician